Albin Polasek (February 14, 1879 – May 19, 1965) was a Czech-American sculptor and educator. He created more than 400 works during his career, 200 of which are displayed in the Albin Polasek Museum & Sculpture Gardens in Winter Park, Florida.

Career
Born as Albín Polášek in Frenštát, Moravia, part of the Austria-Hungary (now in the Czech Republic), Polasek apprenticed as a wood carver in Vienna. At the age of 22, he emigrated to the United States and began formal art training at age 25 under Charles Grafly at the Pennsylvania Academy of the Fine Arts in Philadelphia. As a student, he first produced Man Carving His Own Destiny (1907) and Eternal Moment (1909). In 1909, Polasek became an American citizen; in 1910, he won the Rome Prize competition; in 1913, he received honorable mention at the Paris Salon for "The Sower;" in 1915, he took the Widener Gold Medal from the Pennsylvania Academy of the Fine Arts for his sculpture "Aspiration."

At age 37, after periods of residence in Rome and New York City, he was invited to head the sculpture department at the Art Institute of Chicago, where he remained for nearly 30 years. While there he created the original Forest Idyll; Victorious Christ for St. Cecelia's Cathedral in Omaha, Nebraska; Kenilworth Memorial relief, Kenilworth, Illinois; The Spirit of Music in Grant Park in Chicago; the Woodrow Wilson Memorial in Prague, Czech Republic; Governor Richard Yates sculpture, capital grounds, Springfield, Illinois; and many other works. Polasek was elected an associate member of the National Academy of Design in 1927 and full member in 1933.

Albin Polasek was a close friend of fellow artist Louis Grell while he lived at Tree Studios in Chicago.  The Grell Family archive collection contains letters by Grell discussing Polasek's move to Florida and becoming ill shortly after.

In 1950, Polasek retired at age 70 to Winter Park, Florida. Within months, he suffered a stroke that left his left side paralyzed; he subsequently completed 18 major works with his right hand only, including Victory of Moral Law, the artist's comment on the 1956 Hungarian Revolution. Toward the end of 1950, at age 71, he married former student Ruth Sherwood, who died 22 months later in October 1952. In 1961, Polasek married Emily Muska Kubat. Upon his death in 1965, Polasek was buried beside his first wife in Winter Park's Palm Cemetery, where his 12th Station of the Cross (1939) is his monument. Emily M.K. Polasek died in 1988.

Selected works
Polasek's better-known works include the Theodore Thomas Memorial (1924), the 1941 memorial to Tomáš Garrigue Masaryk in Chicago, the Wilson Memorial (1928), Radegast (1929) and Sts. Cyril and Methodius (1929) in the Czech Republic. His Mother Crying Over the World (1942) was a response to World War II and his Victory of Moral Law (1956) to the Hungarian Revolution.

Cemetery monuments
Like many other sculptors of his era, Polasek created several cemetery memorials. Notable among these are The Pilgrim and The Mother (1927), both located in the Bohemian National Cemetery in Chicago, and the Pilgrim at the Eternal Gate in Lake View Cemetery in Cleveland, Ohio.  Pictures of all three are featured in both biographies listed in the sources section.

Images

See also 

Forest Idyll

Literature 

 JAEGEROVÁ, Anna. Albín Polášek: Boundaries of Continents and Ages. Brno, 2018. Available online. Bachelor's thesis. Masaryk University, Faculty of Arts. Thesis supervisor Pavel Suchánek.

References

Kvaran, Einar Einarsson, Cemetery Sculpture in America, unpublished manuscript
Polasek, Albin Polasek: Man Carving His Own Destiny, Albin Polasek Foundation  1970
Sherwood, Ruth, Carving His Own Destiny: The Story of Albin Polasek, Ralph Fletcher Seymour, Publisher, Chicago  1954

External links
Polasek Museum

1879 births
1965 deaths
People from Frenštát pod Radhoštěm
People from the Margraviate of Moravia
Austro-Hungarian emigrants to the United States
American people of Czech descent
American architectural sculptors
American male sculptors
Czech Roman Catholics
Czech sculptors
Czech male sculptors
Modern sculptors
Artists from Chicago
People from Winter Park, Florida
20th-century American sculptors
20th-century American male artists
National Sculpture Society members
Sculptors from Illinois
Pennsylvania Academy of the Fine Arts alumni
National Academy of Design members